Keya Paha or Keyapaha may refer to one of the following:

 Keya Paha County, Nebraska
 Keyapaha, South Dakota
 Keya Paha River